Cheshmeh Avash (also Romanized as Cheshmeh Āvash; also known as Cheshmeh Āveshk) is a village in Beyhaq Rural District, Sheshtomad District, Sabzevar County, Razavi Khorasan Province, Iran. At the 2006 census, its population was 332, in 72 families.

References 

Populated places in Sabzevar County